Irene Moillen is a Swiss para-alpine skier.

Moillen represented Switzerland in alpine skiing at the 1976 Winter Paralympics. She also represented Switzerland at the 1980 Winter Paralympics. She won three gold medals at the 1976 Winter Paralympics.

Achievements

See also 
 List of Paralympic medalists in alpine skiing

References 

Living people
Year of birth missing (living people)
Place of birth missing (living people)
Paralympic alpine skiers of Switzerland
Alpine skiers at the 1976 Winter Paralympics
Alpine skiers at the 1980 Winter Paralympics
Medalists at the 1976 Winter Paralympics
Paralympic gold medalists for Switzerland
Paralympic medalists in alpine skiing